Kang Shin-Woo is a former South Korean football player. He joined Daewoo Royals in 1982. After retirement he became a football commentator.

Club career
He was founding member of Daewoo Royals and transferred to Luckey-Goldstar Hwangso.

References

External links
 

1959 births
Living people
South Korean footballers
K League 1 players
Busan IPark players
FC Seoul players
Seoul National University alumni
Footballers at the 1982 Asian Games

Association footballers not categorized by position
Asian Games competitors for South Korea